The Nephrology Dialysis Transplantation is a monthly peer-reviewed medical journal. It is published by Oxford University Press on behalf of the European Renal Association - European Dialysis and Transplant Association. It is abstracted and indexed in PubMed/MEDLINE/Index Medicus. According to the Journal Citation Reports, the journal has a 2021 impact factor of 7.186. The journal's current editor-in-chief is Denis Fouque (Centre Hospitalier Lyon Sud, Pierre-Bénite, France).

References

External links 
 

Oxford University Press academic journals
Monthly journals
English-language journals
Nephrology journals
Publications established in 1981
Organ transplantation journals